United Nations Security Council resolution 754, adopted without a vote on 18 May 1992, after examining the application of the Republic of Slovenia for membership in the United Nations, the Council recommended to the General Assembly that Slovenia be admitted. The recommendation came amid the breakup of Yugoslavia.

See also
 Member states of the United Nations
 List of United Nations Security Council Resolutions 701 to 800 (1991–1993)

References
Text of the Resolution at undocs.org

External links
 

 0754
 0754
 0754
 0754
May 1992 events